Grant Smith may refer to:

 Grant Smith (footballer, born 1980), Scottish footballer
 Grant Smith (footballer, born 1993), English footballer
 Ellis Grant Smith, Canadian musician of the R&B band Grant Smith & The Power
 R. Grant Smith (born 1939), American diplomat
 Grant Smith (field hockey) (born 1971), Australian field hockey player 
 Grant Maloy Smith (born 1957), American singer, songwriter, musician, and businessman
 Grant Smith (politician), mayor of Palmerston North, New Zealand